"The Stroke" is a song written and recorded by American rock artist Billy Squier. It was released in 1981 as the debut single from his 3× Platinum album Don't Say No.

This was Squier's first single to chart, reaching No. 17 on the US Billboard Hot 100. It was a bigger hit on rock radio, reaching No. 3 on the Top Tracks chart. It also reached the UK Singles Chart, rising to No. 52. It was named the 59th best hard rock song of all time by VH1.

Charts

Weekly charts

Year-end charts

In popular culture
In 1995, the song was used in the movie Billy Madison
In 2007, the song was used in the movie Blades of Glory
In 2022, Quebec internet star Joel Martel used a modified version of the song during a binge watch of a series called Pignon sur rue, which aired on his Twitch channel. He played the song when one of his followers, Francois Guyon (a.k.a. "L'homme du futur"), showed up every night.
The song was sampled in "Berzerk" by Eminem on his 2013 album The Marshall Mathers LP 2.
In 2007, it was used in an episode of the Adult Swim series Lucy, the Daughter of the Devil.
The song was the inspiration for the 1989 rap artist Maestro Fresh-Wes hit "Let Your Backbone Slide".
The song was used in the opening mission of the popular first-person shooter Call of Duty: Black Ops Cold War, and is the first sound the player hears upon starting the game's campaign.

References

External links
 Lyrics of this song

1981 debut singles
1981 songs
Billy Squier songs
Capitol Records singles
Funk rock songs
Song recordings produced by Reinhold Mack
Songs written by Billy Squier